Atractantha is a South American genus of bamboo in the grass family, native to Brazil, Colombia, and Venezuela.

Species
 Atractantha amazonica Judz. & L.G.Clark - Amazonas in Brazil, Amazonas in Venezuela, Vaupés in Colombia
 Atractantha aureolanata Judz. - Espírito Santo, Bahia
 Atractantha cardinalis Judz. - Bahia
 Atractantha falcata McClure - Bahia
 Atractantha radiata McClure - Bahia
 Atractantha shepherdiana Santos-Gonç. - Espírito Santo

See also
 List of Poaceae genera

References

Bambusoideae
Bambusoideae genera
Flora of South America
Taxa named by Floyd Alonzo McClure